Cy Coleman (born Seymour Kaufman; June 14, 1929 – November 18, 2004) was an American composer, songwriter, and jazz pianist.

Life and career
Coleman was born Seymour Kaufman in New York City, United States, to Eastern European Jewish parents, and was raised in the Bronx. His mother, Ida (née Prizent) was an apartment landlady and his father was a brickmason. He was a child prodigy who gave piano recitals at venues such as Steinway Hall, Town Hall, and Carnegie Hall between the ages of six and nine. Before beginning his fabled Broadway career, he led the Cy Coleman Trio, which made many recordings and was a much-in-demand club attraction.

Despite the early classical and jazz success, Coleman decided to build a career in popular music. His first collaborator was Joseph Allen McCarthy, but his most successful early partnership, albeit a turbulent one, was with Carolyn Leigh. The pair wrote many pop hits, including "Witchcraft" and "The Best Is Yet to Come". One of his instrumentals, "Playboy's Theme," became the signature music of the regular syndicated late night TV show Playboy After Dark in the 1960s.  This included specials presented by the editor/publisher Hugh M. Hefner of Playboy magazine, and remains synonymous with the Chicago magazine and its creator, Hefner.

Coleman's career as a Broadway composer began when he and Leigh collaborated on Wildcat (1960), which marked the Broadway debut of movie/television comedienne Lucille Ball. The score included the hit tune "Hey, Look Me Over". When Ball became ill, she left the show, and it closed. Next for the two was Little Me, with a book by Neil Simon based on the novel of the same name by Patrick Dennis. The show introduced "Real Live Girl" and "I've Got Your Number," which became popular standards.

In 1964, Coleman met Dorothy Fields at a party, and when he asked if she would like to collaborate with him, she is reported to have answered: "Thank God somebody asked." Fields was revitalized by working with the much younger Coleman, and by the contemporary nature of their first project, which was Sweet Charity, again with a book by Simon, starring Gwen Verdon, and introducing the songs "If My Friends Could See Me Now", "I'm a Brass Band" and "Big Spender". The show was a major success and Coleman found working with Fields much easier than with Leigh. The partnership was to work on two more shows – an aborted project about Eleanor Roosevelt, and Seesaw which reached Broadway in 1973 after a troubled out-of-town tour. Despite mixed reviews, the show enjoyed a healthy run. The partnership was cut short by Fields' death in 1974.

Coleman remained prolific in the late 1970s. He collaborated on I Love My Wife (1977) with Michael Stewart, On the Twentieth Century (1978) with Betty Comden and Adolph Green, and Home Again, Home Again with Barbara Fried, although the latter never reached Broadway. Also in 1970, he produced the single "Lying Here" (Mercury 73150) for the Rock opera Sensations, and took a full-page (back cover) advert in Billboard magazine to promote his upcoming star vocalist Steve Leeds.

In 1980, Coleman served as producer and composer for the circus-themed Barnum, which co-starred Jim Dale and Glenn Close. Later in the decade, he collaborated on Welcome to the Club (1988) with A. E. Hotchner, and City of Angels (1989) with David Zippel. In the latter, inspired by the hard-boiled detective film noir of the 1930s and 1940s, he returned to his jazz roots, and the show was a huge critical and commercial success. The 1990s brought more new Coleman musicals to Broadway: The Will Rogers Follies (1991), again with Comden and Green, The Life (1997), a gritty look at pimps, prostitutes, and assorted other lowlife in the big city, with Ira Gasman, and a revised production of Little Me.

Coleman's film scores include Father Goose, The Art of Love, Garbo Talks, Power, and Family Business. In addition, he wrote memorable television specials for Shirley MacLaine, If My Friends Could See Me Now and Gypsy in My Soul. Coleman has been the only composer to win consecutive Tony awards for Best Score at the same time that the corresponding musicals won for Best Musical: City of Angels and The Will Rogers Follies (although Stephen Sondheim actually won three consecutive Tony Awards for Best Score for Company, Follies, and A Little Night Music, Follies did not win for Best Musical). Coleman was on the ASCAP Board of Directors for many years and also served as their Vice Chairman Writer.

One final musical with a Coleman score played in Los Angeles at the Mark Taper Forum between December 2003 and January 2004, under the title Like Jazz, as a Broadway tryout. Investor Transamerica Capital went forward with plans to mount a Broadway production renamed In the Pocket. Dirk Decloedt and Maurice Hines were announced as director and choreographer with an anticipated opening in Spring 2006 but it never opened.

Education 
Coleman studied at New York's The High School of Music & Art and the New York College of Music, graduating in 1948.

Death
Coleman died of cardiac arrest at 11:59 pm on November 18, 2004, at New York Hospital, aged 75. He was survived by his wife, Shelby Coleman (née Brown) and their adopted daughter, Lily Cye Coleman (born in 2000). To the very end, he was part of the Broadway scene – he had attended the premiere of Michael Frayn's new play Democracy earlier on November 18.

Theatre credits

Awards, nominations and honors

Awards and nominations
1997 Tony Award Best Book of a Musical The Life (nominee)
1997 Tony Award Best Musical The Life (nominee) 	
1997 Tony Award Best Original Score The Life (nominee)
1991 Tony Award Best Musical The Will Rogers Follies (winner)
1991 Tony Award Best Original Score The Will Rogers Follies (winner)
1990 Tony Award Best Musical City of Angels (winner)
1990 Tony Award Best Original Score City of Angels (winner)
1980 Tony Award Best Musical Barnum (nominee) 	
1980 Tony Award Best Original Score Barnum (nominee) 	
1978 Tony Award Best Musical On the Twentieth Century (nominee)
1978 Tony Award Best Original Score On the Twentieth Century (winner)
1977 Tony Award Best Musical I Love My Wife (nominee)
1977 Tony Award Best Original Score I Love My Wife (nominee)
1974 Tony Award Best Musical Seesaw (nominee) 	
1974 Tony Award Best Original Score Seesaw (nominee) 	
1966 Tony Award Best Composer and Lyricist Sweet Charity (nominee)
1966 Tony Award Best Musical Sweet Charity (nominee) 	
1963 Tony Award Best Composer and Lyricist Little Me (nominee)	
1963 Tony Award Best Musical Little Me (nominee)

He also won three Emmy Awards and two Grammy Awards, and an Academy Award nomination.

Honors

Among his many honors and awards, Coleman was elected to the Songwriter's Hall of Fame (1981), and was the recipient of the Songwriter's Hall of Fame Johnny Mercer Award (1995) and the ASCAP Foundation Richard Rodgers Award for lifetime achievement in American musical theatre.  He was elected to the American Theatre Hall of Fame and received an Honorary Doctorate from Hofstra University in 2000.

References

External links
 
 
 Excerpts from Life Stories of Cy, Shelby's show about her late husband - YouTube

 
1929 births
2004 deaths
American jazz pianists
American male pianists
American film score composers
American musical theatre composers
American television composers
Broadway composers and lyricists
Broadway theatre producers
Drama Desk Award winners
The High School of Music & Art alumni
Grammy Award winners
Jubilee Records artists
Jewish American film score composers
Jewish American songwriters
New York College of Music alumni
Musicians from New York City
Primetime Emmy Award winners
Steinhardt School of Culture, Education, and Human Development alumni
Songwriters from New York (state)
Tony Award winners
20th-century American pianists
20th-century American composers
Jazz musicians from New York (state)
American male jazz musicians
Äva Records artists
20th-century American male musicians